The Swan 54 was a Sailing boat designed by German Frers and built by Nautor's Swan and first launched in 2016 the year of the companies 50th Anniversary. The boat is actually a development of the Swan 53 Mk II and is primarily intended for distance cruising with the first boat featuring in-mast furling as Swan tried to separate it racing and cruising models due to the significant difference now required to be successful in each market. The Club Swan 50 was launched months apart and is a racer/cruiser.

References

External links
 Nautor Swan
 German Frers Official Website

Sailing yachts
Keelboats
2010s sailboat type designs
Sailboat types built by Nautor Swan
Sailboat type designs by Germán Frers